Lee Hyun-jae (born April 12, 1988) is a South Korean actor and drummer. He made his acting debut in South Korean television drama High Kick Through the Roof (2009). He featured in the commercially successful Chinese films, Tiny Times 3 (2014) and Tiny Times 4 (2015), and helped him achieve general recognition in China.

Filmography

Television dramas 
 High Kick Through the Roof (2009)
 Color of Woman (2011)
 Flower Band (2012)
 Ad Genius Lee Tae-baek (2013)
 Queen of the Office (2013)
Reckless Family (2013-2014)
 Song of Phoenix (2016)
 Please Find Her (2017)

Feature films 
 Play (2011)
 Tiny Times 3 (2014)
 Tiny Times 4 (2015)
 Cities in Love (2015)
 The Old Cinderella 2 (2015)
 Movie Master of Pretending (2016)

References

External links 

1988 births
Living people
People from Icheon
21st-century South Korean male actors
South Korean male television actors
South Korean male film actors
South Korean drummers
South Korean people of American descent
21st-century drummers